Swapan Saha (born 10 January 1930 in Ajmer, Rajasthan, British India) is an Indian (Bengali) film director, producer, story writer and score composer.

Filmography

 Bedenir Prem (1992)
 Maan Samman (1993)
 Biswas Abiswas (1994)
 Danga (1994)
 Sujan Sakhi (1995)
 Naginkanya (1995)
 Bhai Amar Bhai (1996)
 Jhinukmala (1996)
 Sakhi Tumi Kar (1996)
 Abujh Mon (1996)
 Adarer Bon (1997)
 Kamalar Banabas (1997)
 Bakul Priya (1997)
 Mayer Dibyi (1997)
 Tomake Chai (1997)
 Pita Mata Santan (1997)
 Nishpap Asami (1997)
 Sabar Upare Maa (1997)
 Mayar Badhan (1997)
 Matir Manush (1997)
 Praner Cheye Priyo (1998)
 Nayaner Alo (1998)
 Nag Nagini (1998)
 Gharer Lakshmi (1998)
 Baba Keno Chakar (1998)
 Sundari (1998)
 Shimul Parul (1998)
 Swamir Adesh (1998)
 Tomay Pabo Bole (1999)
 Swamir Ghar (1999)
 Satyam Shivam Sundaram (1999)
 Santan Jakhan Satru (1999)
 Manush Kano Beiman (1999)
 Madhu Malati (1999)
 Kanchanmala (1999)
 Satbhai (2000)
 Gariber Samman (2000)
 Ei Ghar Ei Sansar (2000)
 Bhalobasi Tomake (2000)
 Jabab Chai (2001)
 Guru Shisya (2001)
 Streer Maryada (2002)
 Shatrur Mokabila (2002)
 Kurukshetra (2002)
 Sukh Dukkher Sansar (2003)
 Sneher Protidan (2003)
 Sabuj Saathi (2003)
 Kartabya (2003)
 Guru (2003 film) (2003)
 Tyag (2004)
 Sajani (2004)
 Coolie (2004)
 Annaye Atyachar (2004)
 Agni (2004)
 Rajmohal (2005)
 Debi (2005)
 Agnishapath (2006)
 Swarthopar (2006)
 Shakal Sandhya (2006) - Remake of Unnidathil Ennai Koduthen
 MLA Fatakeshto (2006)
 Hero (2006) - Remake of Appu
 Hangama (2006)
 Ghatak (2006) - Remake of Dhool
 Abhimanyu (2006)
 Tiger (2007) - Remake of Ramanaa
 Minister Fatakeshto (2007) - Remake of Mudhalvan
 Greptar (2007)
 Takkar (2008)
 Jor (2008) - Remake of Okkadu
 Janmadata (2008)
 Golmaal (2008) - Remake of Thenkasipattanam
 Aamar Pratigya (2008)
 Rajkumar (Unreleased) (2008)
 Achena Prem (2011) - Remake of Mussanjemaatu
 Shrestha Bangali  (2017)

Producer

 Manush Kano Beiman (1999)

References

External links

www.upperstall.com
www.citwf.com

1930 births
Living people
Bengali film directors
People from Ajmer
Film directors from Rajasthan
20th-century Indian film directors
21st-century Indian film directors
Film producers from Rajasthan
Film producers from West Bengal
Film directors from Kolkata